Crossens railway station was a railway station serving Crossens, a suburb of Southport, Sefton, Merseyside, England.

History
In April 1904 it became the last electrified station on the Lancashire and Yorkshire Railway's suburban lines from Liverpool Exchange railway station, forming a terminus of the Southport - Crossens electric branch. Services ended on 6 September 1964 with the closure of the Southport to Preston line.

Layout
The station consisted of two platforms. A turnback track siding was provided for the electric Class 502 trains if a through train to either Southport or Preston was scheduled.

Just beyond the end of the electrified section was a level crossing with a controlling signal box on the line from Southport to Preston.

References

Disused railway stations in the Metropolitan Borough of Sefton
Buildings and structures in Southport
Former Lancashire and Yorkshire Railway stations
Beeching closures in England
Railway stations in Great Britain closed in 1964
Railway stations in Great Britain opened in 1878